Monkton is a village and civil parish on the River Otter, about 2 miles north east of Honiton railway station, in the East Devon district, in the county of Devon, England. In 2011 the parish had a population of 169. The parish touches Cotleigh, Upottery, Honiton, Offwell and Luppitt. The parish is in the Blackdown Hills Area of Outstanding Natural Beauty.

Features 
There are 5 listed buildings in Monkton.

History 
The name "Monkton" means 'Monks' farm/settlement' and is likely to have been of Ango-Saxon origin. The parish was historically in the Colyton hundred. On the 24th of March 1884 an area from Combe Raleigh parish was transferred to the parish. The transferred area contained 4 houses in 1891.

References

External links 

Villages in Devon
East Devon District